The 2016 Nordic Futsal Championship, was the sixth edition of the Nordic Futsal Championship hosted by Gothenburg, Sweden.

Final standings

Matches and results

Awards

 Winner:  Sandefjord
 Runners-up:  Golden Futsal Team
 Third-Place:  IFK Göteborg Futsal
 Top scorer:
 Best Player:

References

External links
 Futsal Planet

Nordic Futsal Championship
2016–17 in European futsal
International futsal competitions hosted by Sweden
futsal
International sports competitions in Gothenburg
2010s in Gothenburg